Chapel Hill Historic District may refer to:

 Chapel Hill Historic District (Cumberland, Maryland), listed on the National Register of Historic Places (NRHP)
 Chapel Hill Historic District (Chapel Hill, North Carolina), NRHP-listed

See also
 West Chapel Hill Historic District, Chapel Hill, North Carolina, NRHP-listed